Adetomyrma caudapinniger (from Latin caudapinna, "tail fin", and gero, "have", referring to the distinctive paramere) is a species of ant endemic to Madagascar.

Description
Adetomyrma caudapinniger is only known from males. The male is distinguished easily from other Adetomyrma males by its bilobed paramere and 2,2 palpal formula. These characters, as well as those observed in the aedeagus, are unique to Adetomyrma caudapinniger, and a separation of this species from the remaining Adetomyrma species is clear and consistent. For example, A. aureocuprea, which is superficially similar to A. caudapinniger, has a simple paramere and a 3,3 palpal formula.

References

Amblyoponinae
Blind animals
Insects described in 2012
Hymenoptera of Africa
Endemic fauna of Madagascar